A List of highways numbered 981:

Canada
 Saskatchewan Highway 981, a provincial highway in the east central region of the Canadian province of Saskatchewan

United States
 Louisiana Highway 981 (LA 981), a state highway in Louisiana that serves Pointe Coupee Parish
 Pennsylvania Route 981 (PA 981), a state highway which runs across Westmoreland County
 Puerto Rico Highway 981 (PR-981), a highway in Ceiba and Fajardo municipalities